Xylotoles nudus is a species of beetle in the family Cerambycidae. It was described by Henry Walter Bates in 1874. It is known from New Zealand. It contains the varietas Xylotoles nudus var. prolongatus.

References

Dorcadiini
Beetles described in 1874